Bathybembix macdonaldi is a species of sea snail, a marine gastropod mollusk in the family Eucyclidae.

Description
The size of the shell varies between 25 mm and 70 mm.

Distribution
This species occurs in the Pacific Ocean from Ecuador to Chile.

References

External links
 To Biodiversity Heritage Library (1 publication)
 To Encyclopedia of Life
 To World Register of Marine Species
 

macdonaldi
Gastropods described in 1890